Estádio Aníbal Torres Costa, usually simply Aníbal Costa is an association football stadium in Tubarão, near Santa Catarina, Brazil. The stadium holds 15,000 people. It was inaugurated in 1955. The stadium is owned by Hercílio Luz Futebol Clube and it is the home ground of Tubarão Futebol Clube.

History

References

External links
:pt:Estádio Aníbal Torres Costa

Football venues in Santa Catarina (state)
Sports venues in Santa Catarina (state)